Mikaella Chaliou (born 27 August 1991) is a Cypriot footballer who plays as a forward for First Division club Lefkothea Latsion and the Cyprus women's national team.

References

1991 births
Living people
Women's association football forwards
Cypriot women's footballers
Cyprus women's international footballers